Mastery is the fifth book by the American author Robert Greene. The book examines the lives of historical figures such as Charles Darwin and Henry Ford, as well as the lives of contemporary leaders such as Paul Graham and Freddie Roach, and examines what led to their success. The book was published on November 13, 2012 by Viking Adult.

Origins

The book originated from a realization that Greene reached while writing and researching his previous books; Greene concluded that the people he studied had similar paths to success. After finishing The 50th Law, Greene focused on this concept in writing Mastery.

Synopsis
Mastery explains how to become successful by examining the lives of historical figures such as Wolfgang Amadeus Mozart and Albert Einstein, as well as through Greene's interviews with contemporary figures such as Teresita Fernández, Cesar Rodriguez, and Daniel Everett.

Reception
Mastery reached #6 on The New York Times Bestseller list and was featured in The New York Times, CNN Money, The Huffington Post, Business Insider, Forbes, Management Today, and Fast Company.

References

External links
 Top ideas with visual notes for  Mastery
 Power Seduction and War: The Blog of Robert Greene
 The Magic of Apprenticeship — A How-To Guide on TheFourHourWorkweek.com
 The Path to Mastery on Copyblogger
 Robert Greene on How to Become Exceptional at Whatever You Do on The Rise to the Top

2012 non-fiction books
Business books
Self-help books
Books by Robert Greene (American author)
Viking Press books